The Samuel Singleton House is a historic house in Ferron, Utah. It was built in 1896 for Thomas Singleton, a cattleman who went on to serve as the first mayor of Ferron in 1900. He became one of the largest landowners in Emery County, where he founded stores and a bank. He was a member of the Church of Jesus Christ of Latter-day Saints and a Republican, and the father of a son and four daughters; he died of pneumonia in 1929. The house was designed in the Stick-Eastlake style. It has been listed on the National Register of Historic Places since November 8, 1979.

References

		
National Register of Historic Places in Emery County, Utah
Stick-Eastlake architecture in the United States
Houses completed in 1896
1896 establishments in Utah